was a sumo wrestler from Shibata, Niigata, Japan. A former amateur champion, he turned professional in 1970. His highest rank was komusubi. He wrestled for Tokitsukaze stable and took his shikona or fighting name from the head coach who recruited him, former ozeki Yutakayama Katsuo. After his retirement in 1981 he became an elder of the Japan Sumo Association, and founded the Minato stable which he led from 1982 until 2010. He died of pancreatic cancer in 2020.

Career
He began sumo from a young age and became a high school yokozuna. He graduated in 1966 and then became an amateur champion at Tonodai University. He came from a poor family of farmers, and having to work to support himself as well as study, he had less time for training and did not win as many amateur titles as his rival at the time, Nihon University's Wajima Hiroshi. He had plans to become a teacher, but was persuaded to join the professional sport in March 1970, debuting in the third highest makushita division. His head coach at Tokitsukaze stable was ex-ōzeki Yutakayama Katsuo, also from Tonodai University.  Wajima had joined professional sumo one tournament earlier, and such was the interest in their rivalry that when the two met in the jūryō division during the November 1970 tournament, sponsors placed kensho money on the bout, which normally is only allowed in the top division.

He initially fought under his own surname of Nagahama, and continued to use it upon reaching the top division in November 1971, but in July 1972 he persuaded his stablemaster to let him use his  old shikona of Yutakayama. He fought in the top division for 51 tournaments, earning three special prizes and earning eight gold stars for defeating yokozuna, including four from Wajima, his rival from his amateur days. He first reached the sanyaku ranks in September 1972 when he was promoted to komusubi. Although he was to hold the rank on two further occasions, he never managed a winning record there. Despite his success against several yokozuna he was never able to defeat Kitanoumi in the top division, losing to him 21 times in 21 matches. He also had a poor record against ozeki Takanohana, beating him only once in 22 matches.

He did not miss a single bout in his career, fighting 996 consecutive matches. This is the second longest streak for former collegiate competitors, after Asanowaka's 1145.

Retirement from sumo
He retired in May 1981 and became an elder of the Japan Sumo Association under the name Minato Oyakata. He founded Minato stable in 1982 and remained head coach there until 2010, when he passed control of the stable over to former maegashira Minatofuji, and took the name Tatsutagawa. He was also a Deputy Director of the Sumo Association. He reached the mandatory retirement age for elders of 65 in October 2012.

Fighting style
Yutakayama was a yotsu-sumo specialist who liked to fight on the mawashi or belt and his most common winning kimarite were yori-kiri (force out), tsuri-dashi (lift out) and uwatenage (overarm throw).

Personal life and death
He was married with two daughters. His stablemaster did not allow him to get married until he reached the jūryō division in September 1970. The wedding reception took place in October 1971.

He died of pancreatic cancer on 19 September 2020 at the age of 72.

Career record

See also
Glossary of sumo terms
List of sumo tournament second division champions
List of past sumo wrestlers
List of komusubi

References

External links
Complete career record

1947 births
2020 deaths
Japanese sumo wrestlers
Sumo people from Niigata Prefecture
Komusubi
Deaths from pancreatic cancer
Deaths from cancer in Japan